The 1935 South Carolina Gamecocks football team was an American football team that represented the University of South Carolina as a member of the Southern Conference (SoCon) during the 1935 college football season. In their first season under head coach Don McCallister, the Gamecocks compiled an overall record of 3–7 with a mark of 1–4 in conference play, tying for eighth place in the SoCon.

Schedule

References

South Carolina
South Carolina Gamecocks football seasons
South Carolina Gamecocks football